Gomelavia  was an airline based in Gomel, Belarus. It was established in 1996 and operated domestic and regional, scheduled and chartered services, as well as aerial work using fixed-wing aircraft and helicopters. Its main base was Gomel Airport. The state-owned company ceased operations on 22 February 2011.

Destinations

At the time of its closure, Gomelavia served Minsk, Kaliningrad and Moscow from its base at Gomel.

Fleet
When it was shut down in 2011, Gomelavia operated three Antonov An-24s. In 2007, the fleet had included the following aircraft:
1 Antonov An-12BP
1 Antonov An-12PS
4 Ilyushin Il-76TD
3 Ilyushin Il-76
1 Tupolev Tu-134A-3

References

External links

 (Archive)

Defunct airlines of Belarus
Airlines established in 1996
Airlines disestablished in 2011
Gomel
Belarusian companies established in 1996
2011 disestablishments in Belarus